Maroon was a German metalcore band based in Nordhausen. They were formed in 1998.

History
Maroon released a demo cassette in 1999 entitled The Initiate although all four songs can be found on later releases. Their first CD, Captive in the Room of the Conspirator, was recorded at Headquarters Studion in Berlin in spring 2000 and released that year on the (now-defunct) Kerosene Recordings label, featuring such songs as "The Solution' which strongly advocated a vegan lifestyle and support for animal liberation and earth liberation.  The band began touring Europe, opening for hardcore acts including Earth Crisis and Morning Again, which were cited as major influences.

Later that year, Maroon released a 7" split with Absidia on the Crap Chords label, featuring the song "Wasted" from The Initiate.  That winter the band went back to the studio to record a split album with Self Conquest entitled The Key, this time using 101 Studios, also in Berlin.  Afterwards the band toured Europe and opened for bands including Heaven Shall Burn and Caliban.

In November 2001, Maroon entered Rape of Harmonies Studios to record their debut full-length, Antagonist, released on US vegan straight edge hardcore label Catalyst Records.

After some line-up changes Maroon switched labels to Alveran Records in 2003, who then re-released Antagonist.  February 2004 saw the band at Denmark's Antfarm Studio recording a new full-length album entitled Endorsed by Hate.  Following the recording, original guitarist Marc Zech left the band, and was replaced by Sebastian Rieche.  The album was released in Europe in June, and between June and December 2004 Maroon played 60 shows across Europe, including major festivals such as With Full Force and Pressure Fest.  In October, the band switched labels again, signing to Century Media Records.  In early 2005, Century Media/Abacus released Endorsed by Hate in North America.

In March 2006, Century Media released Maroon's fourth full-length album When Worlds Collide. October 2007 saw the release of their second album for Century Media titled The Cold Heart of the Sun, and their latest, Order, was released on April 20, 2009.

After Sebastian Rieche and Nick Wachsmuth left in April 2011, the band was on a hold. Despite announcing a new album, they split up after a final tour in 2014.

Their songs "Wake up in Hell", "The Omega Suite Pt. II" and "At the Gates of Demise" were featured in the movie Zombie Strippers.

Band members

Final Lineup
Andre Moraweck – vocals (1998-2014)
Sebastian Grund – guitar (1998-2014)
Tom-Eric Moraweck – bass guitar (1998-2014)
Steven Holl – guitar (2013-2014)
Benjamin Kühnemund - drums (2013-2014)

 Former members
 Uwe Gruse - drums (1998-2001)
 Marc Zech – guitar (1998-2005)
 Nick Wacksmuth – drums (2001-2011)
 Sebastian "Riechtor" Rieche – guitar (2005-2011)

Timeline

Discography

 Studio albums

 EPs

 Split albums

 Demo albums

 Music videos

References

External links

 
 

German metalcore musical groups
Musical groups established in 1998
Century Media Records artists
Abacus Recordings artists
Straight edge groups
Musical quintets